The 1979–80 FA Trophy was the eleventh season of the FA Trophy, and it was the first season that the newly formed Alliance Premier League would be Step 5 in the English Pyramid System.

Preliminary round

Ties

Replays

2nd replay

3rd replay

First qualifying round

Ties

Replays

2nd replay

Second qualifying round

Ties

Replays

2nd replay

Third qualifying round

Ties

Replays

2nd replay

1st round
The teams that given byes to this round are Stafford Rangers, Worcester City, Kettering Town, Altrincham, Telford United, Maidstone United, Scarborough, Boston United, Weymouth, Yeovil Town, Nuneaton Borough, Bangor City, Matlock Town, Bedford Town, Runcorn, Lancaster City, Enfield, Wycombe Wanderers, Dagenham, Tooting & Mitcham United, Leatherhead, Spennymoor United, Hendon, Slough Town, Winsford United, Marine, Blyth Spartans, Cheltenham Town, Mossley, Barking, Chorley and Bishop Auckland.

Ties

Replays

2nd round

Ties

Replays

3rd round

Ties

Replays

4th round

Ties

Replays

Semi finals

First leg

Second leg

Final

References

General
 Football Club History Database: FA Trophy 1979-80

Specific

1979–80 domestic association football cups
League
1979-80